Earl Leslie Krugel (November 24, 1942 – November 4, 2005) was the coordinator of the Jewish Defense League in the Western United States. In 2005, he was sentenced to prison on charges of terrorism after he confessed to plotting, with the group's leader Irv Rubin, to blow up the office of Arab-American congressman Darrell Issa and the King Fahd mosque in Culver City, California. He was kept in protective custody for three years for the 2001 bomb plot. He was transferred to a medium security federal prison following his sentencing where he was then murdered three days later by a fellow inmate, who struck him in the head with a block of concrete.

Life
At one time, Krugel worked as a dental assistant in California's San Fernando Valley. He had been active with the Jewish Defense League since its founding in 1968.

In November 2001, he was arrested at his home in California after receiving a delivery of gunpowder. Bomb components including pipes, end caps, detonators and gunpowder were confiscated along with multiple rifles and handguns. In December 2001 Krugel and Rubin were arraigned on conspiracy charges to send explosives to the Sherman Oaks office of U.S. congressman Darrell Issa, a Lebanese-American, and to bomb the King Fahd Mosque in Culver City. According to the affidavit in support of the charges, Krugel had stated to an FBI informant that "Arabs needed a wake-up call and the JDL needed to do something to one of their 'filthy mosques'. According to the San Francisco Chronicle the affidavit also "painted a picture of a tiny gang that sat around talking about what to blow up but generally shied away from blowing up people".

In 2003, the bombing charges were dropped and Krugel was allowed to plead guilty to reduced charges of conspiracy to violate civil rights, and to a weapons charge. U.S. District Court Judge Ronald S.W. Lew accepted the plea.  Part of the plea agreement demanded that Krugel reveal the names of all JDL activists involved in the 1985 bombing of Alex Odeh's office. The plea agreement was later retracted with details sealed to the public. He was sentenced to 20 years in prison in September 2005.

Imprisonment and death
On November 4, 2005, at the Federal Correctional Institution in Phoenix, Arizona, Krugel, BOP# 20966-112, was murdered by a member of the Aryan Brotherhood prison gang, who used a concrete block to strike his head. Krugel had been at the medium security prison for just three days.

The suspect, David Frank Jennings, 30, a white supremacist, attacked Krugel from behind with a piece of concrete hidden in a bag while Krugel was using an exercise machine, delivering multiple blows to his skull, face and neck. Krugel suffered multiple skull fractures, internal bleeding and multiple lacerations to his head, face and brain. The beating knocked out teeth and also fractured one of his eye sockets. Krugel was pronounced dead at the scene.

In 2007, Jennings plead guilty to second-degree murder, and in 2008 was sentenced to 35 years in prison.

References

External links 
Feds Indict Suspect in Prison Murder of JDL's Krugel, Jewish Journal
JDL Head Arrested, JewishJournal.com, December 14, 2001
Mike Levy, JDL Trial Set for October, Rubin, Krugel attorneys have been unable to speak with informant in bomb plot case, JewishJournal.com, April 12, 2002
Jim Crogan,Krugel Gets 20 Years for Bomb Plot, JewishJournal.com, September 30, 2005.
Inmate Charged With First Degree Murder, Phoenix FBI web site
Secret Trial is a Poor Departure from Precedent

1942 births
2005 deaths
American Kahanists
20th-century American Jews
Jewish religious terrorism
American people imprisoned on charges of terrorism
American people who died in prison custody
Prisoners murdered in custody
Prisoners who died in United States federal government detention
Anti-Arabism in North America
Victims of antisemitic violence
21st-century American Jews